Alexander Manu (born February 1, 1954, in Bucharest, Romania) is a strategic innovation consultant, lecturer and author particularly on the subject of innovation. He currently teaches at OCAD University and is a visiting lecturer at the Walace McCain Institute of Entrepreneurship. Between 2007-2019 Alexander was an adjunct professor at Rotman School of Management at the University of Toronto, where he introduced Innovation, Foresight and Business Design in the MBA curricula.

Early life and education
In 1978 Manu graduated from the Institute of Fine Arts of Bucharest, Romania.

Publications 
Transforming Organizations for the Subscription Economy, Routledge Publishing 2017 
VALUE CREATION AND THE INTERNET OF THINGS. How the Behaviour Economy will Shape the 4th Industrial Revolution Gower Publishing. 2015, 248 pages, Hardback. . 
BEHAVIOUR SPACE: Play, Pleasure and Discovery as a Model for Business Value. (Gower Publishing, 2012 UK. 210 pages, Hardback. . Disruptive Business: Desire, Innovation and the Re-Design of Business (Gower, 2010)Everything 2.0 (2008)The Imagination Challenge: Strategic Foresight and Innovation in the Global Economy (Peachpit Press, 2006)The Big Idea of Design (1999) ToolToys: Tools with an Element of Play'' (1995)

References

1954 births
Living people
Canadian designers
Academic staff of OCAD University